Floyd Jaszewski (June 5, 1927 – April 17, 2010) was an American football tackle. He played for the Detroit Lions from 1950 to 1951.

He died on April 17, 2010, in Cape Coral, Florida at age 82.

References

1927 births
2010 deaths
American football tackles
Minnesota Golden Gophers football players
Detroit Lions players
Edison High School (Minnesota) alumni